Bedil Masroor (b. July 1947) is a PTV producer and a popular writer and singer of Sindhi poetry.

Early life 
He attended primary school Kasai Muhalla Shikarpur and Government high school Shikarpur. Masroor was born at ShikarPur and graduated from the University of Sindh.

References

Sindhi people
1947 births
University of Sindh alumni
Pakistan Television Corporation people
Pakistani television people
Pakistan Television Corporation executives
Pakistani television producers
Musicians from Karachi
Pakistani television writers
Living people